Southern Alberta is a region located in the Canadian province of Alberta.  In 2004, the region's population was approximately 272,017. The primary cities are Lethbridge and Medicine Hat. The region is known mostly for agricultural production, but other sectors, such as alternative energy, film production and tourism, are emerging.

Geography
The region has a total area of approximately 75,500 km2 (29,151 sq mi).

Southern Alberta is in the northern Great Plains region, lined to the east from the Canadian Rocky Mountains and their foothills. The rest of the region is dominated by the semi-arid prairies of the Palliser's Triangle, where farms and ranches have been built, often with the help of irrigation. Rivers generally flow from west to east and include the Oldman River, Bow River, Red Deer River, South Saskatchewan River, and Milk River. Milk River is the only river in Canada that eventually flows into the Gulf of Mexico.

The environment is protected in such areas as Waterton Lakes National Park and Cypress Hills Interprovincial Park, while sites such as Head-Smashed-In Buffalo Jump, Dinosaur Provincial Park and Writing-on-Stone Provincial Park were declared UNESCO World Heritage Sites. The Alberta Badlands are developed in the northeast of the region, prominently along the Red Deer River. Cypress Hills, located in the east, at the border with Saskatchewan, are the highest point between the Rocky Mountains and Labrador.

Infrastructure

Major highways
Highway 1
Highway 2
Highway 3 (Crowsnest Highway)
Highway 4
Highway 5
Highway 36 (Veteran Memorial Highway)
Highway 41 (Buffalo Trail)

Health regions
Calgary Health Region
Chinook Health
Palliser Health Region

Economy
In 2007, Alberta Human Resources and Employment reported the fields of finance, insurance, real estate, professions, technicians and senior managers will lead the Lethbridge–Medicine Hat region's growth with an average 2.8% real GDP growth each year until 2011. The industries of manufacturing, energy, mining and forestry would account for 2.6% each. All ten of these fields would account for more than half of the region's domestic product.

Politics
On a provincial level, southern Alberta is represented in the Legislative Assembly of Alberta by MLAs elected in the ridings of Airdrie-Cochrane, Airdrie-East, Banff-Kananaskis, Brooks-Medicine Hat, Cardston-Siksika, Chestermere-Strathmore, Cypress-Medicine Hat, Highwood, Lethbridge East, Lethbridge West, Livingstone-Macleod, and Taber-Warner.

Municipalities 

Cities
Brooks
Lethbridge
Medicine Hat

Towns
Bassano
Bow Island
Cardston
Claresholm
Coaldale
Coalhurst
Drumheller
Fort Macleod
Granum
Hanna
Magrath
Milk River
Nanton
Nobleford
Oyen
Picture Butte
Pincher Creek
Raymond
Redcliff
Stavely
Strathmore
Taber
Three Hills
Trochu
Vauxhall
Vulcan

Villages
Acme
Arrowwood
Barnwell
Barons
Carbon
Carmangay
Cereal
Champion
Coutts
Cowley
Delia
Duchess
Empress
Foremost
Glenwood
Hill Spring
Hussar
Linden
Lomond
Milo
Morrin
Munson
Rockyford
Rosemary
Standard
Stirling
Tilley
Warner
Youngstown

Specialized municipalities
Crowsnest Pass

Improvement districts
Improvement District No. 4 (Waterton)

Municipal districts
 Acadia No. 34, Municipal District (M.D.) of
 Cardston County
 Cypress County
 Forty Mile No. 8, County of
 Kneehill County
 Lethbridge County
 Newell, County of
 Pincher Creek No. 9, M.D. of
 Ranchland No. 66, M.D. of
 Starland County
 Taber, M.D. of
 Vulcan County
 Warner No. 5, County of
 Wheatland County
 Willow Creek No. 26, M.D. of

Special areas
 Special Area No. 2
 Special Area No. 3

Notes

External links
Alberta South
Alberta SouthWest
South Grow
Economic Development Alliance of Southeast Alberta

 
Great Plains
Geographic regions of Alberta